"Chapter 1: Stranger in a Strange Land" is the premiere episode of the American streaming television series The Book of Boba Fett. It follows Boba Fett and Fennec Shand attempting to gain control of Jabba the Hutt's criminal empire after his death in Return of the Jedi (1983). The episode is set in the Star Wars universe, sharing continuity with The Mandalorian and other spin-offs such as Ahsoka. It was written by the series' showrunner Jon Favreau and directed by Robert Rodriguez.

Temuera Morrison reprises his role as Fett from the second season of The Mandalorian, with Daniel Logan appearing as a younger version and Ming-Na Wen joining him as Fennec Shand. Matt Berry, David Pasquesi, and Jennifer Beals also star. Filming began in November 2020 and concluded in June 2021. "Chapter 1: Stranger in a Strange Land" was released on Disney+ on December 29, 2021.

Plot
In present day Tatooine Boba Fett has a dream about his past. While inside a Sarlacc Fett struggles within its digestive system. He retrieves an oxygen unit from the armor of a swallowed Stormtrooper before punching a hole through the sarlacc's gut and firing a flamethrower, creating a hole in which he escapes the creature. A weakened Fett climbs out of the Great Pit of Carkoon and is left for dead by Jawas who steal his Mandalorian armor and jetpack. Later, a group of Tusken Raiders stumble upon the unconscious Fett and drag him through the sands to their encampment. That night, Fett awakens, bound to a wooden post, seated nearby a red Rodian. Fett manages to untie his ropes and attempts to escape, but the Rodian cries, alerting the rest of the Tusken clan. Fett tries to run but fails to escape the Tuskens. The next day, Fett and the Rodian are forced to dig for black melons in the desert until they were attacked by a large sand creature that killed the Rodian. Fett kills the creature, saving a Tusken child. The tribe's chieftain gives a black melon to Fett.

Five years later, in Fett’s palace on Tatooine, Fennec Shand wakes Fett up in his Bacta Pod and they travel with their two new Gamorrean bodyguards to a Mos Espa cantina, where Max Rebo and a Bith are performing. An astromech droid asks why they are here, and Shand tells him that they have business with Madam Garsa Fwip. Fett allows two Twi'leks to clean their helmets while they wait for Fwip. Fwip welcomes them to the Sanctuary and Fett introduces Shand and informs her that he has replaced Bib Fortuna as daimyo of Tatooine. He then introduces himself and reassures her that her business will continue under his watchful eye. Fwip thanks him for personally traveling to The Sanctuary, saying he is always welcome and has Twi’leks return their helmets with Fett’s being filled with credits as tribute.

The two are then ambushed by six crimson-clad figures armed with plasma pikes and energy shields, who surround the two in a circle and a fight ensues, with Fett and Shand barely holding their own before the Gamorreans come to their aid, breaking the circle, and allowing Fett and Shand to regain the upper hand. They dispatch three of the attackers and lead the other three to attempt to escape. Fett fires a rocket at one, disintegrating the attacker with a rocket. The other two climbs to the rooftops, and are pursued by Shand, retrieving her helmet on the way. Before leaving, Fett tells Shand to capture them alive. Shand catches up and disarms them, knocking one off the rooftop to his death and capturing the other. The Gamorreans bring Fett back to the palace and into his Bacta Pod.

Production

Development

A feature film focusing on the character had been in development since 2013, but was canceled in 2018 was Lucasfilm prioritizing The Mandalorian instead. In May 2020, the character was announced to be appearing in the show’s second season. The show’s finale featured an end credits sequence which confirmed a spin-off series titled The Book of Boba Fett, set for release in December 2021. Robert Rodriguez, who had also directed Chapter 14 of The Mandalorian directed this episode. Series creator and showrunner Jon Favreau wrote the episode.

Jon Favreau, The Mandalorians creator and showrunner, soon clarified that The Book of Boba Fett was a series separate from the third season of The Mandalorian. He explained that the spin-off was not announced by Lucasfilm president Kathleen Kennedy at the Investor Day event because they did not want to "spoil the surprise" of the reveal at the end of the episode. He added that production had already begun on the spin-off.

Casting

With the series' official announcement in December 2020, Temuera Morrison and Ming-Na Wen were confirmed to be reprising their respective roles of Boba Fett and Fennec Shand from The Mandalorian and other previous Star Wars media. Also starring is Matt Berry as 8D8, a torture droid in Fett's service, David Pasquesi as the Twi'lek majordomo to Mok Shaiz, and Jennifer Beals, who was revealed to have a role in November 2020, as Garsa Fwip. Other appearances include Dawn Dininger as a Rodian prisoner, Barry Lowin as Garfalaquox, Frank Trigg and Collin Hymes as Gamorrean guards, and Paul Darnell as a Night Wind assassin.

Director Rodriguez appears as Dokk Strassi and Mok Shaiz, while Xavier Jimenez, Wesley Kimmel, and Joanna Bennett star as the Tusken chief, kid, and warrior, respectively. Daniel Logan appears as a younger Fett, reprising his role from Star Wars: Episode II – Attack of the Clones (2002) and The Clone Wars (2008) television series.

Filming
Filming for the series began in late November 2020, on the StageCraft video wall volume in Los Angeles that was previously used for the first two seasons of The Mandalorian.

Reception

The episode received positive reviews. Review aggregator Rotten Tomatoes reported an approval rating of 82% based on 57 reviews, with an average rating of 6.60/10. The website’s critic’s consensus states, "'Stranger in a Strange Land' could use more propulsion to properly open up The Book of Boba Fett, but its lean summary of the bounty hunter's history provides some clarity without diminishing his mystique."

Notes

References

External links 
 
 

2021 American television episodes
American television series premieres
The Book of Boba Fett episodes
Television episodes directed by Robert Rodriguez